Pangalan (stylized as PANGALAN:) is the second studio album by Filipino singer-songwriter Unique Salonga. It was released on March 27, 2020, by O/C Records following his debut studio album Grandma in 2018.

Background
On April 22, 2019, he posted a plain green picture on his Facebook page along with the caption 'SECOND ALBUM', making his fans wonder about his announcement for that album.

On July 6, 2019, he released his first single on the album, "Lamang Lupa", and its vertical music video was later released on July 20, 2019.

The second single from the album, "Bukod-Tangi", was released on August 16, 2019, the day after the first anniversary of his debut album. Its 360° music video was released on YouTube on February 7, 2020.

On November 20, 2020, O/C Records released the music video for "Huwag Ka Sanang Magagalit".

Production
The production and recording of the album started on 2019. The album consists of 8 tracks. Unique was credited as the primary writer, producer, arranger of the album, and the instrumentation of the whole album was made by Salonga himself on vocals, guitar, and synth, Divino Dayacap on piano and percussions, Ghabby Gee on drums, and Emil Dela Rosa on bass, who also mixed and mastered the tracks of the album. "Bukod-Tangi" and "Lamang Lupa", which were the singles from Pangalan, were the first songs to be recorded for the album itself, while "Pahinga" was the last track to be recorded for the album.

Track listing

Accolades

References

Viva Records (Philippines) albums
2020 albums
Unique (musician) albums